Rodolfo Martínez Estrada (born 24 August 1948) is a Mexican former professional boxer. He is a former NABF super bantamweight, bantamweight and the WBC bantamweight champion.

Early life
Martínez was born on August 28, 1946, and raised in Tepito, a borough of Mexico City. He is the eldest of six children of Alfonso Martínez and Angelina Estrada.

Professional career
In June 1972, Rodolfo Martínez won his first NABF Championship by Knocking out Octavio Gomez.

WBC Bantamweight Championship
His first shot at a WBC Bantamweight Championship was on against Rafael Herrera but he would lose by T.K.O. in the twelfth round On December 7, 1974, Martínez got his revenge and the WBC Bantamweight Championship by Knocking out Rafael Herrera in the fourth round. 
Rodolfo would go on to make four title defences until he lost to an undefeated Hall of Famer, the Mexican Carlos Zárate.

See also
List of Mexican boxing world champions
List of WBC world champions
List of bantamweight boxing champions

References

External links

Boxers from Mexico City
World boxing champions
World Boxing Council champions
World bantamweight boxing champions
Bantamweight boxers
1948 births
Living people
Mexican male boxers